Enallagma is a genus of damselflies in the family Coenagrionidae commonly known as bluets. Adults range in length from 28 mm to 40 mm. Males are usually bright blue and black while the coloration of females varies by species. Bluets can be distinguished from the similar vivid dancer by wing position; at rest, bluets' wings hang down on either side of their body, while vivid dancers hold their wings above their body. Bluets also have shorter leg spines.

Subspecies 
The genus consists of the following species:

Enallagma ambiguum 
Enallagma anna  – River Bluet
Enallagma annexum  – Northern Bluet
Enallagma antennatum  – Rainbow Bluet
Enallagma aspersum  – Azure Bluet
Enallagma basidens  – Double-Striped Bluet
Enallagma boreale  – Boreal Bluet
Enallagma cardenium  – Purple Bluet
Enallagma carunculatum  – Tule Bluet
Enallagma civile  – Familiar Bluet
Enallagma clausum  – Alkali Bluet
Enallagma concisum  – Cherry Bluet
Enallagma cyathigerum  – Common Blue Damselfly
Enallagma daeckii  – Attenuated Bluet
Enallagma davisi  – Sandhill Bluet
Enallagma deserti  – Desert Bluet
Enallagma divagans  – Turquoise Bluet
Enallagma doubledayi  – Atlantic Bluet
Enallagma dubium  – Burgundy Bluet
Enallagma durum  – Big Bluet
Enallagma ebrium  – Marsh Bluet
Enallagma eiseni  – Baja California Bluet
Enallagma exsulans  – Stream Bluet
Enallagma geminatum  – Skimming Bluet
Enallagma hageni  – Hagen's Bluet
Enallagma laterale  – New England Bluet
Enallagma minusculum  – Little Bluet
Enallagma novaehispaniae  – Neotropical Bluet
Enallagma pallidum  – Pale Bluet
Enallagma parvum  
Enallagma pictum  – Scarlet Bluet
Enallagma pollutum  – Florida Bluet
Enallagma praevarum  – Arroyo Bluet
Enallagma recurvatum  – Pine Barrens Bluet
Enallagma semicirculare  – Claw-tipped Bluet
Enallagma signatum  – Orange Bluet
Enallagma sulcatum  – Golden Bluet
Enallagma traviatum  – Slender Bluet
Enallagma truncatum  – Cuban Bluet
Enallagma vernale  – Vernal Bluet
Enallagma vesperum  – Vesper Bluet
Enallagma weewa  – Blackwater Bluet

References

Coenagrionidae
Zygoptera genera
Odonata of North America
Taxa named by Toussaint de Charpentier